Johanna Olson-Kennedy is an American physician who specializes in the care of children and teenagers with gender dysphoria and youth with HIV and chronic pain. She is board-certified in pediatrics and adolescent medicine and is the medical director of the Center for Transyouth Health and Development at Children's Hospital Los Angeles.

Olson-Kennedy has co-authored multiple studies on transgender youth. She also has been interviewed for multiple news pieces.

Selected publications 

 Olson-Kennedy J, Mental Health Disparities Among Transgender Youth: Rethinking the Role of Professionals, JAMA Pediatr. 2016 May 1;170(5):423-4. doi: 10.1001/jamapediatrics.2016.0155 
 Olson-Kennedy J, Cohen-Kettenis P. T., Kreukels B.P.C, Meyer-Bahlburg H.F.L, Garofalo R, Meyer W, Rosenthal S.M., Research Priorities for Gender Nonconforming/Transgender Youth: Gender Identity Development and Biopsychosocial Outcomes, Curr Opin Endocrinol Diabetes Obes. 2016 Apr;23(2):172-9. doi: 10.1097/MED.0000000000000236.
 Olson J, Forbes C, Belzer M. Management of the transgender adolescent. Arch Pediatr Adolesc Med. 2011 Feb;165(2):171-6. doi: 10.1001/archpediatrics.2010.275. Review. PubMed PMID 21300658.
 Olson J, Garofalo R. 2014. The peripubertal gender-dysphoric child: puberty suppression and treatment paradigms. Pediatr Ann. 43(6):e132-7. doi: 10.3928/00904481-20140522-08.
 Olson J, Schrager S, Belzer M, Simons L*, Clark L. Baseline physiologic and psychosocial characteristics of transgender youth seeking care for gender dysphoria. Journal of Adolescent Health, July 2015 doi: 10.1016/j.jadohealth.2015.04.027

References

External links 
 Transgender Community Questions & Answers With Johanna Olson, MD – CHLA’s Transyouth Program (archived)
 Human Rights Campaign: Transgender Children & Youth: Ask the Expert - Is My Child Transgender?

Living people
Year of birth missing (living people)
American pediatricians
Women pediatricians
Transgender studies academics
American LGBT businesspeople